Igor Savić may refer to:

 Igor Savić (footballer, born 1997), Serbian football forward for Borac Čačak
 Igor Savić (footballer, born 2000), Bosnian football midfielder for Torpedo Moscow
 Igor Savić (football manager) (fl. 2017-2022), Serbian football manager